Valley Camp is an unincorporated community in Ohio County, West Virginia, United States.

References

Unincorporated communities in Ohio County, West Virginia
Unincorporated communities in West Virginia